The karantouzeni is a stringed instrument of the lute family resembling the tambouras, although larger and possessing four strings. It is used in the rebetiko genre, a synthesis of the disparate remnants of urban Byzantine culture that was in many places subsumed by the predominant Turkish culture of the Ottoman Empire. It is usually tuned in the Ntouzeni style, much like the bouzouki, another pre-Ottoman revival instrument associated with the rebetiko movement..

See also
Greek musical instruments
Greek folk music
Greek music

References
Music instruments

Greek musical instruments
Greek music
String instruments